Arkansas Highway 122 (AR 122, Hwy. 122) is an east–west state highway in Independence County, Arkansas. The route of  runs from Highway 14 near Oil Trough north and east through Newark to Highway 25 near Cord.

Route description
AR 122 begins near Oil Trough at Highway 14. The route runs north past Akron Cemetery to intersect Highway 69 before entering Newark. Highway 112 runs as Locust Street and intersects Highway 69B (6th Street) before passing the Dearing House, which is listed on the National Register of Historic Places, and exiting town northbound. The route passes through a rural part of the county lined with trees and farms before serving as the northern terminus for Highway 37 at Cord.

Traffic counts from the Arkansas State Highway and Transportation Department (AHTD) reveal that approximately 1100–1800 vehicles per day (VPD) use Highway 122. These counts are entirely within this range except for the rural portion between Newark and Cord, which sees an average of 660 VPD.

Major intersections

References

External links

122
Transportation in Independence County, Arkansas